PSKT Kemutar Telu stand for Persatuan Sepakbola Kemutar Telu Sumbawa Barat (en: Football Association of Kemutar Telu West Sumbawa) is an Indonesian football club based in Kemutar Telu, West Sumbawa Regency, West Nusa Tenggara. They compete in Liga 3, the lowest tier of Indonesian football.

Honours
 Liga 3 West Sumbawa
 2016, 2017

References

Football clubs in Indonesia
Football clubs in West Nusa Tenggara